Nativitas  is a station on Line 2 of the Mexico City Metro system.  It is located in the Colonia Nativitas and Colonia Lago neighborhoods of Benito Juárez borough of Mexico City, directly south of the city centre on Calzada de Tlalpan. It is a surface station.

General information
The station logo depicts a trajinera – a type of small punt-style boat, still used today in the canals of Xochimilco. The name Nativitas refers to a lake that formerly existed here, on which the inhabitants farmed on a network of artificial islands known as  chinampas. The name later referred to a small villa built in the outskirts of Mexico City during the first half of the 20th century.  The station opened on 1 August 1970.

Exits
East: Calzada de Tlalpan between Justina street and Don Luis street, Nativitas
West: Calzada de Tlalpan and Lago Poniente street, Colonia Lago

Ridership

See also 
 List of Mexico City metro stations

References

External links 

Nativitas
Railway stations opened in 1970
1970 establishments in Mexico
Mexico City Metro stations in Benito Juárez, Mexico City
Accessible Mexico City Metro stations